Jacques Tremblay (born 8 February 1942 in Iberville, Quebec) was a Canadian politician.

He was elected to the National Assembly of Quebec for the Quebec Liberal Party in the Iberville electoral district.  He served one term, and did not run in the 1989 election.

He should not be confused with Jacques-Raymond Tremblay (no relation), who served in the same electoral district for the same political party from 1973 to 1976.

External links
 

1942 births
Living people
People from Montérégie
Quebec Liberal Party MNAs